55 Andromedae, abbreviated 55 And, is a single, orange-hued star in the northern constellation of Andromeda. 55 Andromedae is the Flamsteed designation. It is visible to the naked eye with an apparent visual magnitude of 5.42. It is a member of the Sirius supercluster.

This is an aging giant star with a stellar classification of K1 III, which indicates it has exhausted the hydrogen supply at its core and evolved away from the main sequence. It is radiating 436 times the Sun's luminosity from its enlarged photosphere at an effective temperature of 4,290 K. It has a magnitude 10.90 visual companion at an angular separation of  along a position angle of 357° from 55 And. In 1828, this separation was just .

References

External links
 Image 55 Andromedae

K-type giants
Andromeda (constellation)
Durchmusterung objects
Andromedae, 55
011428
0543
008814